Walwick is a village in Northumberland, England near Hadrian's Wall.   Nearby villages include Humshaugh, Chollerford and Low Brunton.

Governance 

Walwick is in the parliamentary constituency of Hexham.

References

External links 

Villages in Northumberland